Larry Jeff McMurtry (June 3, 1936March 25, 2021) was an American novelist, essayist, prominent book collector, bookseller and screenwriter whose work was predominantly set in either the Old West or contemporary Texas. His novels included Horseman, Pass By (1962), The Last Picture Show (1966), and Terms of Endearment (1975), which were adapted into films. Films adapted from McMurtry's works earned 34 Oscar nominations (13 wins).

His 1985 Pulitzer Prize-winning novel Lonesome Dove was adapted into a television miniseries that earned 18 Emmy Award nominations (seven wins). The subsequent three novels in his Lonesome Dove series were adapted as three more miniseries, earning eight more Emmy nominations. McMurtry and cowriter Diana Ossana adapted the screenplay for Brokeback Mountain (2005), which earned eight Academy Award nominations with three wins, including McMurtry and Ossana for Best Adapted Screenplay. In 2014, McMurtry received the National Humanities Medal.

Early life and education
McMurtry was born in Archer City, Texas, 25 miles from Wichita Falls, the son of Hazel Ruth (née McIver) and William Jefferson McMurtry. He grew up on his parents' ranch outside Archer City. The city was the model for the town of Thalia which is a setting for much of his fiction. He earned a BA from the University of North Texas in 1958 and an MA from Rice University in 1960.

In his memoir, McMurtry said that during his first five or six years in his grandfather's ranch house, there were no books, but his extended family would sit on the front porch every night and tell stories. In 1942, McMurtry's cousin Robert Hilburn stopped by the ranch house on his way to enlist for World War II, and left a box containing 19 boys' adventure books from the 1930s. The first book he read was Sergeant Silk: The Prairie Scout.

Career

Writer
During the 1960–1961 academic year, McMurtry was a Wallace Stegner Fellow at the Stanford University Creative Writing Center, where he studied the craft of fiction under Frank O'Connor and Malcolm Cowley, alongside other aspiring writers, including Wendell Berry, Ken Kesey, Peter S. Beagle, and Gurney Norman. Wallace Stegner was on sabbatical in Europe during McMurtry's fellowship year.

McMurtry and Kesey remained friends after McMurtry left California and returned to Texas to take a year-long composition instructorship at Texas Christian University. In 1963, he returned to Rice University, where he served as a lecturer in English until 1969, and a visiting professor at George Mason College (1970) and American University (1970–71).  He entertained some of his early students with accounts of Hollywood and the filming of Hud, for which he was consulting. In 1964, Kesey and his Merry Pranksters conducted their noted cross-country trip, stopping at McMurtry's home in Houston. The adventure in the day-glo-painted school bus Furthur was chronicled by Tom Wolfe in his book The Electric Kool-Aid Acid Test. That same year, McMurtry was awarded a Guggenheim Fellowship.

McMurtry won numerous awards from the Texas Institute of Letters: three times the Jesse H. Jones Award—in 1962, for Horseman, Pass By; in 1967, for The Last Picture Show, which he shared with Tom Pendleton's The Iron Orchard; and in 1986, for Lonesome Dove. He won the Amon G. Carter award for periodical prose in 1966 for Texas: Good Times Gone or Here Again? and the Lon Tinkle Award for Lifetime Achievement in 1984. In 1986, McMurtry received the annual Peggy V. Helmerich Distinguished Author Award from the Tulsa Library Trust. He reflected on his 1985 Pulitzer Prize-winning novel, Lonesome Dove, in Literary Life: A Second Memoir (2009), writing that it was the "Gone With the Wind of the West … a pretty good book; it's not a towering masterpiece."

McMurtry described his method for writing novels in Books: A Memoir. He said that from his first novel on, he would get up early and dash off five pages of narrative. When he published the memoir in 2008, he said this was still his method, although by then, he wrote 10 pages a day. He also wrote every day, ignoring holidays and weekends. McMurtry was a regular contributor to The New York Review of Books.

McMurtry was a vigorous defender of free speech and, while serving as president of PEN American Center (now PEN America) from 1989 to 1991, led the organization's efforts to support writer Salman Rushdie, whose novel The Satanic Verses (1988) caused a major controversy among some Muslims, with the Supreme Leader of Iran, Ayatollah Ruhollah Khomeini, issuing a fatwā calling for Rushdie's assassination, after which attempts were made on his life.

In 1989, McMurtry testified on behalf of PEN America before the U.S. Congress in opposition to immigration rules in the 1952 McCarran–Walter Act that for decades permitted the visa denial and deportation of foreign writers for ideological reasons. He recounted how before PEN America was to host the 1986 International PEN Congress, "there was a serious question as to whether such a meeting could in fact take place in this country... the McCarran–Walter Act could have effectively prevented such a gathering in the United States." He denounced the relevant rules as "an affront to all who cherish the constitutional guarantees of freedom of expression and association. To a writer whose living depends upon the uninhibited interchange of ideas and experiences, these provisions are especially appalling." Subsequently, some provisions that excluded certain classes of immigrants based on their political beliefs were revoked by the Immigration Act of 1990.

Antiquarian bookstore businesses
While at Stanford, McMurtry became a rare-book scout. During his years in Houston, he managed a book store called the Bookman. In 1969, he moved to the Washington, D.C., area. In 1970 with two partners, he started a bookshop in Georgetown, which he named Booked Up. In 1988, he opened another Booked Up in Archer City. It became one of the largest antiquarian bookstores in the United States, carrying between 400,000 and 450,000 titles. Citing economic pressures from Internet bookselling, McMurtry came close to shutting down the Archer City store in 2005, but chose to keep it open after great public support.

In early 2012, McMurtry decided to downsize and sell off the greater portion of his inventory. He felt the collection was a liability for his heirs. The auction was conducted on August 10 and 11, 2012, and was overseen by Addison and Sarova Auctioneers of Macon, Georgia. This epic book auction sold books by the shelf, and was billed as "The Last Booksale", in keeping with the title of McMurtry's The Last Picture Show. Dealers, collectors, and gawkers came out en masse from all over the country to witness this historic auction. As stated by McMurtry on the weekend of the sale, "I've never seen that many people lined up in Archer City, and I'm sure I never will again."

Film and television
McMurtry became well known for the film adaptations of his work, which were seen by many viewers, especially Hud (from the novel Horseman, Pass By), starring Paul Newman and Patricia Neal; the Peter Bogdanovich–directed The Last Picture Show; James L. Brooks's Terms of Endearment, which won five Academy Awards, including Best Picture (1984); and Lonesome Dove, which became a popular television miniseries starring Tommy Lee Jones and Robert Duvall.

In 2006, he was co-winner (with Diana Ossana) of both the Best Screenplay Golden Globe and the Academy Award for Best Adapted Screenplay for Brokeback Mountain, adapted from a short story by E. Annie Proulx. He accepted his Oscar while wearing a dinner jacket over jeans and cowboy boots.  In his speech, he promoted books, reminding the audience the movie was developed from a short story. In his Golden Globe acceptance speech, he paid tribute to his Swiss-made Hermes 3000 typewriter.

Personal life
McMurtry married Jo Scott, who is an English professor and has authored five books. Before divorcing, they had a son together, James McMurtry. Both he and his son (Larry's grandson) Curtis McMurtry are singer/songwriters and guitarists.

In 1991 McMurtry underwent heart surgery. During his recovery, he suffered severe depression. He recovered at the home of his future writing partner Diana Ossana and wrote his novel "Streets of Laredo" at her kitchen counter.

McMurtry married Norma Faye Kesey, the widow of writer Ken Kesey, on April 29, 2011, in a civil ceremony in Archer City.

McMurtry died on March 25, 2021, at his home in Archer City, Texas. He was 84 years old.

It was announced in early 2023 that McMurtry's personal property including his writing desk, typewriters and personal book collection would be sold at public auction by Vogt Auction in San Antonio, Texas on May 29th 2023.

Fiction

Stand-alone novels 
 1982: Cadillac Jack
 1988: Anything For Billy (fictionalized biography of Billy the Kid)
 1990: Buffalo Girls (fictionalized biography of Calamity Jane) – adapted for TV as Buffalo Girls
 1994: Pretty Boy Floyd (with Diana Ossana) (fictionalised biography of the titular gangster)
 1997: Zeke and Ned (with Diana Ossana) (fictionalized biography of the last Cherokee warriors)
 2000: Boone's Lick
 2005: Loop Group
 2006: Telegraph Days
 2014: The Last Kind Words Saloon

Thalia: A Texas Trilogy
Larry McMurtry's first three novels, all set in the north Texas town of Thalia after World War II
 1961: Horseman, Pass By – adapted for film as Hud
 1963: Leaving Cheyenne – adapted for film as Lovin' Molly
 1966: The Last Picture Show – adapted for film as The Last Picture Show

Harmony and Pepper series 
The books follow the story of mother/daughter characters Harmony and Pepper
 1983: The Desert Rose
 1995: The Late Child

Duane Moore series 
The books follow the story of character Duane Moore
 1966: The Last Picture Show – adapted for film as The Last Picture Show
 1987: Texasville – adapted for film as Texasville
 1999: Duane's Depressed
 2007: When The Light Goes
 2009: Rhino Ranch: A Novel

Houston series 
The books follow the stories of occasionally recurring characters living in the Houston, Texas, area
 1970: Moving On (characters Patsy Carpenter/Danny Deck/Emma Horton/Joe Percy)
 1972: All My Friends Are Going To Be Strangers (Danny Deck/Jill Peel/Emma Horton)
 1975: Terms of Endearment (Emma Horton/Aurora Greenway) – adapted for film as Terms of Endearment
 1978: Somebody's Darling (Jill Peel/Joe Percy)
 1989: Some Can Whistle (Danny Deck)
 1992: The Evening Star (Aurora Greenaway) – adapted for film as The Evening Star

Lonesome Dove series 

 1985: Lonesome Dove, 1986 Pulitzer Prize winner
 1993: Streets of Laredo
 1995: Dead Man's Walk
 1997: Comanche Moon

The Berrybender Narratives 
 2002: Sin Killer
 2003: The Wandering Hill
 2003: By Sorrow's River
 2004: Folly and Glory

As editor 
 1999: Still Wild: A Collection of Western Stories

Other writings 
 1988: The Murder of Mary Phagan – TV movie
 1990: Montana – TV movie
 1992: Memphis – TV movie
 1992: Falling from Grace – film starring John Mellencamp
 2002: Johnson County War – TV miniseries
 2005: Brokeback Mountain (with Diana Ossana) – Oscar-winning screenplay (adapted from the short story by E. Annie Proulx)
 2020: Joe Bell (with Diana Ossana)

Nonfiction
 1968: In A Narrow Grave: Essays on Texas
 1974: "It's Always We Rambled" (essay)
 1987: Film Flam: Essays on Hollywood 
 1999: Crazy Horse: A Life (biography)
 1999: Walter Benjamin at the Dairy Queen: Reflections on Sixty and Beyond
 2000: Roads: Driving America's Great Highways
 2001: Sacagawea's Nickname—essays on the American West
 2002: Paradise—South-Pacific travelogue/memoir
 2005: The Colonel and Little Missie: Buffalo Bill, Annie Oakley & the Beginnings of Superstardom in America
 2005: Oh What A Slaughter! : Massacres in the American West: 1846—1890
 2008: Books: A Memoir
 2009: Literary Life: A Second Memoir
 2011: Hollywood: A Third Memoir
 2012: Custer

Film

 1963: Hud (based on novel Horseman, Pass By from 1961)
 1971: The Last Picture Show (co-wrote screenplay, based on novel from 1966)
 1974: Lovin' Molly (based on the novel Leaving Cheyenne from 1963)
 1983: Terms of Endearment (based on novel from 1975)
 1990: Texasville (based on novel from 1987)
 1992: Falling from Grace (wrote screenplay and story)
 1996: The Evening Star (based on novel from 1992)
 2005: Brokeback Mountain (co-wrote screenplay with Diana Ossana and adapted from the short story by E. Annie Proulx)
 2020: Joe Bell (co-wrote screenplay with Diana Ossana)

Television

1977: The American Film Institute's 10th Anniversary Special (writer)
1988: The Murder of Mary Phagan (mini-series based on story)
1989: Lonesome Dove (mini-series based on 1985 novel)
1990: Montana (original screenplay)
1992: Memphis (teleplay)
1993: Return to Lonesome Dove (based on the fictional universe of the 1985 novel)
1994–1995: Lonesome Dove: The Series (based on the fictional universe of the 1985 novel)
1995: Buffalo Girls (based on 1990 novel)
1995: Streets of Laredo (wrote teleplay, based on 1993 novel)
1995–1996: Lonesome Dove: The Outlaw Years (based on the fictional world of the 1985 novel)
1996: Dead Man's Walk (wrote teleplay, based on 1995 novel)
2002: Johnson County War (wrote teleplay)
2008: Comanche Moon (wrote teleplay, based on 1997 novel)

See also
Frank Q. Dobbs

References

External links

 Larry McMurtry Collection, from the Rare Book & Texana Collections, University of North Texas website
McMurtry, Larry. "The Author Who Sold Books", Washingtonian, August 1, 2008.
 Larry McMurtry Papers 1984–1991, from the Texas State University-San Marcos website

The Treasure Hunter Michael Dirda review of McMurtry's Books: A Memoir from The New York Review of Books
Larry McMurtry screenplays, 1979–1988 and undated, in the Southwest Collection/Special Collections Library at Texas Tech University
Guide to the Larry McMurtry and Diana Osanna Papers, 1890–2004, in the Woodson Research Center at Rice University
Articles in Western American Literature

1936 births
2021 deaths
Larry McMurtry
20th-century American novelists
21st-century American novelists
American male novelists
American military historians
Best Adapted Screenplay BAFTA Award winners
Best Screenplay BAFTA Award winners
Best Adapted Screenplay Academy Award winners
American chick lit writers
People from Archer City, Texas
People from Wichita Falls, Texas
Pulitzer Prize for Fiction winners
Rice University alumni
University of North Texas alumni
Texas Christian University faculty
Novelists from Texas
Writers Guild of America Award winners
Western (genre) writers
Best Screenplay Golden Globe winners
American male screenwriters
National Humanities Medal recipients
PEN/Faulkner Award for Fiction winners
20th-century American male writers
21st-century American male writers
Stegner Fellows
20th-century American non-fiction writers
21st-century American non-fiction writers
American male non-fiction writers
Screenwriters from Texas
Historians from Texas
American Western (genre) novelists